Communist Party of Nepal (Democratic) was a splinter group of the Communist Party of Nepal (Rayamajhi) formed in 1979, in the backdrop of the popular movement that surged in that year. The party was led by Bishnu Bahadur Manandhar.

History 
The party was initially formed as the Communist Party of Nepal (Manandhar) in 1979. Bishnu Bahadur Manandhar and his supporters had broken away from CPN (Rayamajhi) because of the failure of Keshar Jang Rayamajhi to support the 1979 student protests and supporting the status quo. Manandhar accused Rayamajhi of being a royalist pointing to his appointment in the Royal Council.

The party was sympathetic to the Soviet Union and supported the Soviet intervention in Afghanistan in 1979.

Ahead of the 1991 parliamentary election the party changed its name to Communist Party of Nepal (Democratic). The party contested the 1991 general elections, two candidates from the party got elected out of the 75 candidates that had filed their candidacy. Two months after the election CPN (Democratic) merged with two other parties, Communist Party of Nepal (Burma) and Communist Party of Nepal (Amatya), to form Communist Party of Nepal (United).

Electoral performance

See also
 List of communist parties in Nepal

References 

Defunct communist parties in Nepal
Political parties established in 1979
1979 establishments in Nepal
Political parties disestablished in 1991
1991 disestablishments in Nepal